The term Great Horse may refer to

 Destrier, the "great horse" ridden by knights during the Middle Ages
 Leonardo's horse, aka Gran Cavallo, a statue of a destrier or great horse
 "Great Horse", a song by Tyrannosaurus Rex from their 1970 album A Beard of Stars